Damen is a Dutch patronymic surname meaning "son of Daam". Daam is an archaic nickname for Adam. Variant forms are Daamen, Daams, Daemen, Daems, and Dame. People with the surname include:

Abby Damen (born 1992),  New Zealand actress
Alessandro Damen (born 1990), Dutch football goalkeeper
Arnold Damen (1815–1890), Dutch Jesuit missionary in Chicago, founder of 8 schools
Damen Avenue in Chicago and its four Rapid Transit stations are named after him
Floris Damen (born 1999), Furry
Georgius Damen (1887–1954), Dutch cyclist
Gijs Damen (born 1979), Dutch freestyle swimmer
Grad Damen (born 1997), Dutch football midfielder
 (born 1946), Belgian theater and television actor
 (1898–1957), Dutch violinist
José Damen (born 1959), Dutch butterfly swimmer
Karen Damen (born 1974), Flemish singer, actress, and television host
Kommer Damen (born 1944), Dutch shipbuilder and CEO of the Damen Group
Onorato Damen (1893–1979), Italian communist revolutionary
Piet Damen (born 1934), Dutch racing cyclist
Daams
Hans Daams (born 1962), Dutch racing cyclist
Jessie Daams (born 1990), Belgian racing cyclist, daughter of Hans
Daemen
Jan Daemen Cool (1589–1660), Dutch portrait painter (here "Daemen" is still a patronym)
Joan Daemen (born 1965), Belgian cryptographer
Maria Catharina Daemen or Mother Magdalena Daemen (1787-1858), Dutch Franciscan sister who founded a religious congregation
Daemen University is named after her
Tom Daemen (born 1985), Dutch football midfielder

See also
Daemen University, named for Maria Catharina Daemen
Daems, surname of the same origin
Dahmen (surname), German surname
Damen (disambiguation)

References

Dutch-language surnames
Patronymic surnames